Samuel "Sammy" White (born 19 June 1987) is a 1.0 point wheelchair basketball player from Australia. He was a member of the Rollers team that competed at the 2020 Summer Paralympics.

Biography 
White was born on 19 June 1987. In 2010, a motorcycle accident left him without the use of his legs. White moved from Adelaide to Wisconsin with his family to join the University of Washington wheelchair basketball team while studying information technology systems. At the University of Wisconsin-Whitewater he completed Bachelor of Business Administration and Information Technology and MSE-PD Athletic Administration and Higher Education Leadership.

Basketball 
He is a 1.0 point player. Whilst in the United States, his team won the college championship in back-to-back years from 2014 to 2015. He was a member of Australian Rollers squad in the lead up to 2016 Summer Paralympics.

He was a member of the  Rollers at 2018 Wheelchair Basketball World Championship in Hamburg, Germany, where they won the bronze medal.

At the 2020 Tokyo Paralympics, the Rollers finished fifth with a win/loss record of 4-4.

Referencessamuel

External links
Basketball Australia Profile

1987 births
Living people
Paralympic wheelchair basketball players of Australia
Wheelchair basketball players at the 2020 Summer Paralympics